The Mexican state of Chihuahua held an election on Sunday, 4 July 2004.
At stake was the office of the Chihuahua State Governor, all 33 members of the unicameral Chihuahua State Congress, and 67 mayors and municipal councils.

Turnout was around 46% of the 2,254,234 chihuahuenses eligible to vote.

Governor
At the time of the election, the sitting governor was Patricio Martínez García of the Institutional Revolutionary Party (PRI).

At the close of voting, exit polls were indicating a victory for José Reyes Baeza of a PRI-led alliance with a lead of ten percentage points. As the count progressed, Javier Corral Jurado of the PAN – representing an unusual alliance of his party and the left-leaning PRD – conceded the election at around 23h00 local time.

State congress
22 First-past-the-post deputies:
17 for "Alianza con la Gente" (PRI, PVEM, PT)
5 for "Todos Somos Chihuahua" (PAN, PRD, CD)
11 Proportional representation deputies:
3 for "Alianza con la Gente" (PRI, PVEM, PT)
8 for "Todos Somos Chihuahua" (PAN, PRD, CD)

Municipalities
Preliminary results indicated the state's 67 municipalities would be divided as follows:
44: PRI (in alliance with PVEM and PT)
21: PAN (in alliance with PRD and CD)
1: PRD
1: PVEM (Manuel Benavides municipality)

The PAN/PRD alliance won a closely fought mayoral race in state capital Chihuahua, previously governed by the PRI. In a give-and-take action between the state's two largest cities, borderland industrial and commercial powerhouse Ciudad Juárez fell to the PRI after 12 years of PAN rule.

On the same day
2004 Durango state election
2004 Zacatecas state election

See also
Politics of Mexico
List of political parties in Mexico

External links
 Chihuahua State Electoral Institute

2004 elections in Mexico
Chihuahua (state) elections
July 2004 events in Mexico